Anunciado Serafini (November 16, 1898 – February 18, 1963)  was the Roman Catholic bishop of what is now the Roman Catholic Archdiocese of Mercedes-Luján, Argentina. Ordained to the priesthood on December 20, 1924, Serafini was named Auxiliary Bishop of La Plata and Titular Bishop of Arycanda in 1935, and then Bishop of Mercedes in 1939.

On April 8, 1962, Bishop Serafini consecrated Antonio Quarracino to the episcopacy.  As Cardinal Quarracino later conducted the episcopal consecration of Jorge Mario Bergoglio, the future Pope Francis, Bishop Serafini is part of that pope's episcopal lineage.

References

1898 births
1963 deaths
20th-century Roman Catholic archbishops in Argentina
Roman Catholic bishops of La Plata in Argentina
Roman Catholic bishops of Mercedes-Luján